DXT may refer to:
 Grand Mixer DXT, the credited inventor of turntablism
 DXT, a family of implementations of the S3 Texture Compression algorithm